The Mind, Explained is a 2019 documentary streaming television series. The series is narrated by American actress Emma Stone on Season 1 and Julianne Moore on Season 2, and examines themes such as what happens inside human brains when they dream or use psychedelic drugs. The episodes explore topics including memory, dreams, anxiety, mindfulness, and psychedelics. The Mind, Explained is a spin-off of Vox's Netflix show Explained.

The series makes use of interviews, cartoons, and animation.

Episodes 

There are 5 episodes, each lasting around 20 minutes.

Season 1 (2019)

Season 2 (2021)

Release
The Mind, Explained was released globally on September 12, 2019 on Netflix.

Reception 
The show received mostly positive reviews. The website Decider called it "one of those shows you turn on when you just want to see something short and interesting without having to follow a plot. And though it can be superficial at times, you generally come away from each episode knowing something about your brain you didn't know before." The Review Geek calls the series "[maybe not] the most cerebrally challenging documentary series on the topic but it does have enough engaging material to make for an educational and entertaining watch." While the delivery was appreciated, most people found the content to be fleeting. Emma Stone's narration was widely regarded as doing well.

The first episode of the series has been found lacking compared to others by many reviewers.

References

External links
 
 
 

2019 American television series debuts
2021 American television series endings
2010s American documentary television series
2020s American documentary television series
American television spin-offs
English-language Netflix original programming
Netflix original documentary television series
Vox Media